Munro Briggs Scott (29 April 1889 – 12 April 1917) was a Scottish botanist and British officer killed in WW I.

After education at Buckhaven High School, Scott graduated from the University of Edinburgh with MA and BSc. He was an assistant botanist at Kew Gardens Herbarium from 1914 to 1916. In February 1916 he joined Kew‘s local regiment, the East Surrey Regiment, with the rank of private. He became a lance corporal in the Suffolk Regiment and became a second lieutenant in the 12th Battalion Royal Scots. He married Flora M. Forbes in November 1916. Scott was posted to France in January 1917 and killed in April 1917 at the Battle of Arras.

Eponyms
 Former genus, Briggsia, Craib (W. G. Craib was a colleague and friend of Scott at Kew.)
 Briggsiopsis (the family Gesneriaceae) published in 1985.

References

External links

1889 births
1917 deaths
People educated at Buckhaven High School
Alumni of the University of Edinburgh
19th-century British botanists
20th-century British botanists
British Army personnel of World War I
British military personnel killed in World War I
East Surrey Regiment soldiers
Suffolk Regiment soldiers
Royal Scots officers
Military personnel from Fife